Paolo Damiani (born 1952) is an Italian jazz cellist and double-bassist. Performing primarily avant-garde jazz, he has worked with Gianluigi Trovesi, Kenny Wheeler, Tony Oxley, Paolo Fresu, and John Taylor. Damiani has also recorded on the albums of Deep Forest and  Bauhaus.

Discography

As leader
 Unisoni (Clac, 1989)
 Eso with Paolo Fresu, Gianluigi Trovesi, Danilo Rea, Roberto Gatto, Raffaela Siniscalchi, Antonio Iasevoli, Sabina Macculi (Splasc(H), 1994)
 IS Ensemble (Via Veneto Jazz, 1996)
 Sconcerto with Stefano Benni (Il Manifesto, 1999)
 Mediana with Carlo Mariani, Michele Rabbia, Sandro Satta, Carlo Rizzo (EGEA, 1999)
 Charmediterraneen with Orchestre National De Jazz, Anouar Brahem, Gianluigi Trovesi (ECM, 2002)
 Provvisorio with Alea Ensemble (Splasc(H), 2004)
 Ladybird (EGEA, 2004)
 Jazzitaliano Live 2007 (Casa Del Jazz, 2007)
 Al Tempo Che Fara (EGEA, 2007)
 Pane e Tempesta (EGEA, 2010)
 Classiche Musiche Leggere (Casa Del Jazz, 2016)

As sideman
With Italian Instabile Orchestra
 1991 Live in Noci and Rive-De Gier (Leo)
 1994 Skies of Europe (ECM)
 1997 European Concerts '94–'97 (Nel Jazz)
 2000 Litania Sibilante (Enja)
 2004 The Owner of the Riverbank (Enja)

With Gianluigi Trovesi 
 1983 Roccellanea (Splasc(h))
 1985 Dances (Red)

With others
 1972 "Buon Vecchio Charlie", Buon Vecchio Charlie
 1974 Stairway to Escher, Bauhuas
 1984 Live at Roccella Jonica, Norma Winstone, Kenny Wheeler, Paolo Fresu, John Taylor, Tony Oxley (Splasc(h))
 1990 Giada, Eugenio Colombo (Splasc(h))
 1999 Made in Japan, Deep Forest  (Sony)
 2002 Italian Jazz Graffiti, Civica Jazz Band (Soul Note)

References

Italian jazz musicians
Post-bop double-bassists
Musicians from Rome
1952 births
Living people
Avant-garde jazz cellists
Avant-garde jazz double-bassists
21st-century double-bassists
Italian Instabile Orchestra members
Orchestre National de Jazz members
21st-century cellists